The name Ivo has been used for four tropical cyclones in the Eastern Pacific Ocean:

 Tropical Storm Ivo (2001)
 Hurricane Ivo (2007)
 Tropical Storm Ivo (2013)
 Tropical Storm Ivo (2019)

Pacific hurricane set index articles